Wakerley is a linear village and civil parish in the county of Northamptonshire, England.
 Forming part of North Northamptonshire, Wakerley is close to, and south of, the River Welland that forms the boundary with Rutland; its nearest neighbour, Barrowden, is in that county and accessible by a footbridge. Wakerley is in the area of Rockingham Forest and Wakerley Great Wood is one of the forest's largest remnants. The population of the village is included in the civil parish of Duddington with Fineshade.

The village's name origin is dubious. 'Osier wood/clearing' or perhaps, 'watcher wood/clearing'.

St John the Baptist's church, Grade I listed, has been in the care of the Churches Conservation Trust since the early 1970s.

Recent evidence points to Wakerley's industrial history as an iron-smelting centre. Brick-built calcining kilns were used for reducing iron ore before transport to the Corby Steelworks.

References

External links 

Iron-smelting archaeology
Wild Woods at Wakerley Great Wood (Forestry Commission site)

Villages in Northamptonshire
Civil parishes in Northamptonshire
North Northamptonshire